Charles Riddy (March 3, 1885 – June 11, 1979) was a Canadian rower who competed in the 1908 Summer Olympics in London, England and the 1912 Summer Olympics in Stockholm,  Sweden.

In the 1908 Summer Olympics he was a rower in the Canadian coxless four boat and the Canadian men's eight boat, winning bronze medals in both events.

In the 1912 Summer Olympics he competed in the Canadian coxed eight boat but did not medal.

Riddy moved from his job as a cash boy and stock boy in the millinery department of T. Eaton's to a position with Toronto Dominion Bank in 1903, the same year that he joined the Toronto Canoe Club.

In 1905 he entered the Club races and won the Novice Division.

In 1906 Riddy won the Canadian Junior Singles Championship.

In 1907 Riddy joined the Toronto Argonauts, rowing in the winning fours boat in the Junior, Intermediate and Senior Canadian Championship held in St. Catharines, Ontario.  At the same meet he rowed in the winning eights boat in the Junior and Senior Championship.

Also in 1907 Riddy rowed in the winning senior four and eight boats at the U.S. Championship held in Philadelphia, Pennsylvania.

During 1909 and 1910 Riddy was the Argonauts Rowing captain winning the club championship (The Hammond Cup).

In 1913 Riddy competed at The Henley Regatta in England.

Riddy was the oldest living Canadian Olympian when the 1976 Summer Olympic Games were held in Montreal, Quebec, Canada, though he was not invited to attend.

References

External links
profile

1885 births
1979 deaths
Canadian male rowers
Olympic rowers of Canada
Rowers at the 1908 Summer Olympics
Rowers at the 1912 Summer Olympics
Olympic bronze medalists for Canada
Olympic medalists in rowing
Medalists at the 1908 Summer Olympics